Martin Neilan was an Irish Fianna Fáil politician. He was elected to Dáil Éireann as a Fianna Fáil Teachta Dála (TD) for the Galway constituency at the 1936 by-election caused by the death of Patrick Hogan of Fine Gael. He did not contest the 1937 general election. He was subsequently appointed to the Agricultural Wages Board by the Minister for Agriculture James Ryan.

References

Year of birth missing
Year of death missing
Fianna Fáil TDs
Members of the 8th Dáil
Politicians from County Galway